Elizabeth de Vere may refer to:
Elizabeth de Vere, Countess of Oxford, née Trussell
Elizabeth Trentham, Countess of Oxford, married name de Vere
 Elizabeth de Vere, Countess of Derby, Lord of Mann (1575-1627), daughter of Edward de Vere, 17th Earl of Oxford
 Elizabeth de Vere (died 1375), daughter of John de Vere, 7th Earl of Oxford